Hugo Marinho Borges Calderano (born 22 June 1996, in Rio de Janeiro) is a table tennis player from Brazil. In January 2022, he peaked at number 3 in the world rankings, becoming the greatest Americas player of all time.

He is the first-ever player from Latin America to reach the Top 10 of the ITTF World Rankings. Calderano is also well known for beating China's Fan Zhendong at the quarterfinals of the 2018 ITTF World Tour Grand Finals in Incheon, South Korea.

Career

2021 
In 2021, Calderano announced he was leaving the German Bundesliga and switching to the Russian Champion's league to focus more on international competition. However, Calderano will continue to live in Germany and train in the same training center; he will compete in a different league.

Calderano entered World Table Tennis' inaugural event WTT Doha. After receiving a minor scare in the first round to co-patriot Gustavo Tsuboi, Calderano comfortably beat An Jaehyun in the round of 16. However, he lost to Simon Gauzy in the quarterfinals of the WTT Contender Event. In the WTT Star Contender event, he bowed out in the round of 16 to Darko Jorgic after missing his own serve at deuce in the fifth game. Although it briefly looked like Lin Yun-Ju had passed Calderano for the Olympic fourth seed following the results of WTT Doha, in April ITTF amended the seeding system so that Calderano was once again slated to be the fourth seed.

In an interview with JAPAN Forward in July, Calderano named mentality as one of his strong suits and stated that he used to work with a mental coach until the coach died.

Calderano made up for his loss in the WTT Contender Doha and WTT Star Contender Doha earlier in March by winning the title at WTT Star Contender Doha in September. He defeated Liam Pitchford and Darko Jorgic in the semifinal and final, respectively, on his way to victory.

2020 Olympic Games 

In February 2021, Calderano was already three years among the top ten players in the world in table tennis and was ranked sixth in the world rankings. Calderano qualified for the Tokyo 2020 Olympic Games as seed No.4, being the best non-Asian in the world ranking. 

By beating the South Korean Jang Woojin, number 12 in the ranking, by 4 sets to 3, he became the first Brazilian and Latin American to reach the quarter-finals of table tennis in the Olympic Games.
His Olympic Challenge ended in the quarterfinals with a 2:4 defeat against Dimitrij Ovtcharov, the eventual bronze medallist.

Singles titles

References

External links

 
 
 
 

1996 births
Living people
Brazilian male table tennis players
Table tennis players at the 2016 Summer Olympics
Olympic table tennis players of Brazil
Table tennis players at the 2015 Pan American Games
Table tennis players at the 2014 Summer Youth Olympics
Pan American Games gold medalists for Brazil
Sportspeople from Rio de Janeiro (city)
Pan American Games medalists in table tennis
Table tennis players at the 2019 Pan American Games
Medalists at the 2015 Pan American Games
Medalists at the 2019 Pan American Games
Table tennis players at the 2020 Summer Olympics
21st-century Brazilian people